Anna Pendergast (born 26 June 1961) is a Canadian basketball player. She competed in the women's tournament at the 1984 Summer Olympics.

Awards and honors
Top 100 U Sports women's basketball Players of the Century (1920-2020).

References

External links
 

1961 births
Living people
Basketball people from Prince Edward Island
Canadian women's basketball players
Olympic basketball players of Canada
Basketball players at the 1984 Summer Olympics
Sportspeople from Charlottetown